La Puntilla (Belén) is a village and municipality in Belén Department, Catamarca Province in northwestern Argentina.

References

Populated places in Catamarca Province